Maximum Security is the third studio album by English gothic rock band Alien Sex Fiend, released in October 1985 by Anagram Records.

Release 
Maximum Security peaked at No. 100 in the UK Albums Chart, and is to date their only charting album.

The record was reissued in 1986 in CD format, retitled as The First Alien Sex Fiend Compact Disc and featuring four additional tracks including the single "E.S.T. (Trip to the Moon)". The entire album appeared on the B-side of the 1986 cassette "It" the Cassette.

Reception 

Trouser Press described the album as "bleak and predominantly slow" and that it "suffers from a somewhat monotonous sameness".

Track listing

References

External links 

 

Alien Sex Fiend albums
1985 albums